The Crawford County School District is a public school district in Crawford County, Georgia, United States, based in Roberta. It serves the communities of Knoxville, Musella, and Roberta.

Schools
The Crawford County School District has one elementary school, one middle school, and one high school.

Elementary school 
Crawford County Elementary School

Middle school
Crawford County Middle School

High school
Crawford County High School

References

External links

School districts in Georgia (U.S. state)
Education in Crawford County, Georgia